Ishoʿ (īšōʕ), a cognate of the Hebrew term Yeshu, is the Eastern Syriac pronunciation of the Aramaic form of  the name of Jesus.

It is still commonly used as a name for Jesus among Syriac Christians of the Middle East and Saint Thomas Christians of India. Persons with this name include:
Ishoʿ of Merv
Isho Bar Nun
Isho Shiba

Names with Ishoʿ as a component include Ishoʿbokht, Ishoʿdad, Ishoʿdnaḥ, Ishoʿsabran and Ishoʿyahb.

References

Names of Jesus
Church of the East
Masculine given names